The 1953–54 season was Chelsea Football Club's fortieth competitive season. The club finished 8th in the First Division and were knocked out in the third round of the FA Cup. In September, Chelsea lost 8–1 to Wolverhampton Wanderers, which remains the club's heaviest defeat in a league match.

Table

References

External links
 1953–54 season at stamford-bridge.com

1953–54
English football clubs 1953–54 season